Richard Stenhouse (born 8 May 1966) is a British sailor. He competed in the Finn event at the 1996 Summer Olympics.

References

External links
 

1966 births
Living people
British male sailors (sport)
Olympic sailors of Great Britain
Sailors at the 1996 Summer Olympics – Finn
Sportspeople from Leicester
Musto Skiff class world champions
World champions in sailing for Great Britain